Thrillington is an album produced by English musician Paul McCartney, under the pseudonym Percy "Thrills" Thrillington. It was released in April 1977 in the UK and in May 1977 in the US. It is an instrumental covers album of Paul and Linda McCartney's 1971 album Ram. 

Recorded in June 1971, the album was shelved upon the formation of Wings, and not released for nearly six years.  When Thrillington was finally issued, it did not attract much attention, and did not chart.  McCartney initially kept his involvement with the project a secret; nevertheless, the project's nature and the rather bizarre pseudonym chosen for the credited artist led the few contemporary reviewers who wrote about Thrillington to conclude that "Percy Thrillington" was in fact McCartney working incognito.  McCartney formally revealed himself to be Percy Thrillington in 1989, and the following year also admitted to being "Clint Harrigan", who wrote the album's liner notes. 

In addition to reissues in 1995 and 2018, Thrillington was re-issued as part of the deluxe edition of Ram in 2012.

History
The album was recorded in June 1971 and with an intended release shortly thereafter. Paul McCartney produced the sessions, although he did not play or sing at all on the album, and all arrangements were by Richard Anthony Hewson, who was asked to work on the orchestration before Ram had yet been released.  The album was completed in three days of recording sessions, but when Paul and Linda decided to form Wings, the (at that point untitled) Thrillington album was shelved.

Years later, in late 1976, McCartney decided to release the long-in-storage project, and devised a plan to publicize the album while obscuring his own involvement with it.  In preparation for the release of Thrillington, McCartney invented the fictitious socialite Percy Thrillington, and even took out ads in various UK music papers announcing Thrillington's so-called comings and goings to generate curiosity and interest.

Released in April 1977, McCartney's name was mentioned only in the main liner notes where he is described as a friend of Percy. Thrillington went mostly unnoticed upon its release although it was reviewed by Rolling Stone magazine and mentioned in the "Random Notes" section. Variety also reviewed the album, noting that "Whether Percy Thrillington is Paul McCartney or not is really irrelevant.  What matters is that he (they) is (are) having fun."   

Because it was widely assumed that Thrillington was the product of McCartney working under a pseudonym, the album became a collector's item. McCartney finally admitted his role to journalist Peter Palmiere at a Los Angeles press conference on 27 November 1989 during his world tour: "What a great question to end the conference. The world needs to know! But seriously it was me and Linda – and we kept it a secret for a long time but now the world knows! – you blew it!"

In 1990 Paul McCartney also admitted to Palmiere, via an autograph request, that he was indeed Clint Harrigan – the liner notes writer for Thrillington and Wings' Wild Life album. The first person to reveal the identity of Clint Harrigan was John Lennon, who stated as much during a well-publicised letter feud with McCartney in Melody Maker ("And your writing inside of the Wings album [Wild Life] isn’t exactly the Realist is it?") in December 1971.
The full story of the Thrillington album was told in detail in 1995 in Beatles fanzine Good Day Sunshine and in music journalist Ian Peel's book The Unknown Paul McCartney (Reynolds & Hearn, 2002). Peel tracked down various musicians who brought McCartney's vision to life – including Richard Hewson, Herbie Flowers and the Mike Sammes Singers – as well as those that were involved in creating its mythology.

Re-release
Thrillington was issued on CD in 1995 and 2018, the latter with an accompanying vinyl version.

Thrillington was re-issued as part of the deluxe edition of Ram on 21 May 2012. To coincide with this release, McCartney started a Twitter account under the Thrillington name, posting tweets in a manner similar to the original newspaper announcements. The album was re-issued on CD, vinyl, and limited edition coloured vinyl on 18 May 2018.

Track listing

Personnel

Musicians
Richard Hewson – conductor
Vic Flick – guitars
Herbie Flowers – bass guitar
Steve Gray – piano 
Clem Cattini – drums
Jim Lawless – percussion
Chris Karan – guica
 Members of the Swingle Singers and the Mike Sammes Singers, led by Mike Sammes – backing vocals

Production 
Percy "Thrills" Thrillington – producer
Richard Hewson – arranger
Tony Clark – engineer
Hipgnosis – artwork
Jeff Cummings – cover art
Clint Harrigan – liner notes
Phil Smee – package design

References

External links

1977 albums
Paul McCartney albums
Regal Zonophone Records albums
Capitol Records albums
Covers albums
Albums with cover art by Hipgnosis
Albums produced by Paul McCartney
Works published under a pseudonym
Fictional musicians